Jeffrey Alan Klein M.D., is an American dermatologist from Southern California, who described the tumescent technique for liposuction surgery in 1987, which according to Jayashree Venkataram "revolutionized liposuction surgery" by "permit[ting] liposuction totally by local anaesthesia and with minimal blood loss." He is the author of Tumescent Technique: Tumescent Anesthesia & Microcannular Liposuction, a textbook on liposuction safety and effectiveness.

Education and training 
Klein studied mathematics and physics as an undergraduate at the University of California, Riverside (BA in mathematics).  As a graduate student, he studied mathematics at the Université de Paris and University of California, San Diego (MA in mathematics, 1971).  He graduated from the School of Medicine, University of California, San Francisco in 1976 and spent eight additional years in advanced postgraduate training, with a master's degree in public health (biostatistics and epidemiology) from University of California, Berkeley; three years at University of California, Los Angeles as a resident in internal medicine (certification by the American Board of Internal Medicine, 1980; two years as a National Institute of Health research fellow in clinical pharmacology; and three years at University of California, Irvine as a resident in dermatology (certification by the American Board of Dermatology, 1984).

Klein is currently associate clinical professor of dermatology at University of California, Irvine College of Medicine and in private practice in San Juan Capistrano, California.  He lives in Newport Beach, California.

References

External links
20/20 Interview with Jeffrey A. Klein, MD
Larry King Live Interview with Jeffrey A. Klein, MD

American surgeons
American dermatologists
Living people
Year of birth missing (living people)
University of California, Riverside alumni
University of California, Irvine alumni
University of Paris alumni
University of California, San Francisco alumni
University of California, Berkeley alumni